Ellen Dahrendorf, Baroness Dahrendorf (née Ellen Joan Krug) is a British historian and translator of Russian political works, and the former wife (1980–2004) of the late German/British academic and politician Ralf Dahrendorf.

Lady Dahrendorf has served on the boards of Article 19, the Jewish Institute for Policy Research, has been chair of the British branch of the New Israel Fund,  was a co-founder of the  Working Group on the Internment of Dissidents in Psychiatric Hospitals and also Independent Jewish Voices organisation.

She is the daughter of  James Krug, a school teacher and married Ralf Dahrendorf in 1980.

With her former husband, she lived  in London and with a vacation home in Bonndorf, Germany.

Publications
 Russian Studies, ed. by Leonard Schapiro, 1986

Translations
 A Question of Madness, by Zhores A. Medvedev and Roy A. Medvedev
 On Socialist Democracy, by Roy A. Medvedev
 Unknown Stalin, by Zhores A. Medvedev

References

British historians
British Jews
British baronesses
Living people
Spouses of life peers
Year of birth missing (living people)